Doamna Elena Ecaterina Rareş (died 1553) was a princess consort of Moldavia by marriage to Peter IV Rareș. She was regent in Moldavia in 1551–1553 on the behalf of her son Ştefan VI Rareş. She was the daughter of Serbian Despot Jovan Branković

References

 George Marcu (coord.), Dicţionarul personalităţilor feminine din România, Editura Meronia, București, 2009.

1553 deaths
16th-century women rulers
16th-century Romanian people
Royal consorts of Moldavia
Rulers of Moldavia
Year of birth unknown
Branković dynasty